Cianjhen Star station is a light rail station of the Circular light rail of the Kaohsiung Metro. It is located in Cianjhen District, Kaohsiung, Taiwan.

Station overview
The name of this station is derived from the adjacent landmark Cianjhen Star Bike Bridge. It is a transfer station to the nearby Kaisyuan metro station (凱旋站) of the Red line, of which the nearest entrance is accessible after crossing Kaisyuan 4th Rd.

Station design
The station is a street-level station with two side platforms. It is located at the junction of Jhongshan 3rd Road and Kaisyuan 4th Road.

Station layout

Around the station
 Star-of-Cianjhen Bike Bridge
 Kaisyuan metro station on  Red line
 Cianjhen neighborhood
 Jhongkai Bridge (an automobile viaduct along Jhongshan 3rd Rd.)
 Indigenous People's Park
 Ruinan Park

References

2015 establishments in Taiwan
Railway stations opened in 2015
Circular light rail stations